161 Sussex Street is a heritage-listed historic site located at 161 Sussex Street, in the Sydney central business district, in the City of Sydney local government area of New South Wales, Australia. The property is owned by Property NSW, an agency of the Government of New South Wales. It was added to the New South Wales State Heritage Register on 2 April 1999.

History

Description 

 the building that was previously located at 161 Sussex Street was demolished and made way for the Hyatt Regency Sydney/Four Point development. All that remains is a heritage marker on the driveway in the hotel forecourt.

The site forms part of the Hyatt Regency Sydney/Four Points by Sheraton Hotel development. Redeveloped in 2016 by COX Architecture, the heritage-listed site was conserved and a nearby adjacent 26-storey tower was constructed that added 222 new guest rooms,  convention centre, and commercial office space. The additions were completed in the Millennium Minimalist Modernism style.

Heritage listing 

161 Sussex Street was listed on the New South Wales State Heritage Register on 2 April 1999.

See also 

Hyatt

References

Attribution

External links 

New South Wales State Heritage Register sites located in the Sydney central business district
Articles incorporating text from the New South Wales State Heritage Register
Sussex Street, Sydney